Come Along Now is the first international compilation album and fifth compilation album overall by Greek singer Despina Vandi in 2005. It was later repackaged and released in Greece in 2006 by Heaven Music. The album achieved mild success following her debut international release Gia. The album featured her first three international singles.

Singles
Come Along Now featured Vandi's international singles and tracks from the Gia album. The first of which was "Gia", which not only charted around the world, but also topped the Billboard Hot Dance Airplay for two weeks (week beginning 18 January 2004; 8 February 2004), making it the first non-English song to do so.

The next single was the title track, "Come Along Now", which was chosen as the worldwide song to accompany all of Coca-Cola's 2004 Olympics campaigns.

"Opa Opa" was the next hit single, which also attracted many remixes by some of the world's foremost DJs.

Other songs, although not officially released as singles, still managed to gain substantial airplay and became relatively popular in European clubs include I Believe It (an English version of the hit "Olo Lipis") and C'est La Vie (an English version of the hit "Simera").

Vandi repackaged Come Along Now and released it in Australia as Gia (although notably this should not be confused with Gia, her previous Greek album).

Track listing

International edition
 "Gia" (UK Radio Edit) [Hi]
 "Come Along Now"
 "I Believe It (Olo Lipis)" [(You Are Never Here)]
 "Anavis Foties" [You Start Fires]
 "Thelo Na Se Do" [I Want To See You]
 "Opa Opa" (English Version)
 "C'est la Vie (Simera)" [(Today)]
 "Ola Odigoun Se Esena" [Everyone Leads To You]
 "Lathos Anthropos" [Wrong Guy]
 "Ela" [Come]
 "Deste Mou Ta Matia" [Bind My Eyes]
 "Thimisou" [Remember]

Greek edition
 "Gia" (Original Version)
 "Come Along Now" (English Version)
 "Opa Opa" (Big World Radio Mix)
 "I Believe It (Olo Leipeis)"
 "Anavis Foties"
 "Thelo Na Se Do"
 "Gia" (UK Radio Edit)
 "C'est La Vie" (Simera)
 "Ola Odigoun Se Esena"
 "Lathos Anthropos"
 "Ela"
 'Deste Mou Ta Matia"
 "Thimisou"
 "Greek Town Song"
 "Gia" (DJ Gregory Remix)
 "Opa Opa" (Bass Bumpers Video Edit)
 "Come Along Now vs. Gia"

Russian edition
 "Come Along Now" (feat. Phoebus)
 "Opa Opa"
 "Gia"
 "Olo Lipis"
 "Ola Odigoun Se Sena"
 "Thelo Na Se Do"
 "Simera"
 "Anavis Foties"
 "Ela"
 "Deste Mou Ta Matia"
 "Vges Apo To Mialo Mou"
 "Lathos Anthropos"
 "To Magazaki Tis Kardias Mou"
 "Christougenna"
 "Chrone"
 "I Melodia Tis Monaksias"
 "Gia (Milk 'N' Sugar Edit)"
 "Opa Opa (A1 Milk 'N' Sugar Club Mix)"
 "Come Along Now (Ural Dance Mix)"

Albums produced by Phoebus (songwriter)
Despina Vandi compilation albums
Greek-language albums
2005 compilation albums